Andreas Carl Strassmeir (born May 17, 1959) is a German national and the former head-of-security for the white separatist community of Elohim City, Oklahoma. He gained media attention for his alleged connection to the Oklahoma City Bombing and has become an important figure in its conspiracy theories.

Early life
Strassmeir came from a German family known for its right-wing nationalist sympathies. He was the son of Günter Straßmeir, the Chief of Staff to German Chancellor Helmut Kohl. His grandfather was also a co-founder of the Nazi Party.

Strassmeir studied at a military university in Hamburg, and then went on to serve in the German Army in 1979. His military service lasted for a total of five years.

Time in the U.S.
After resigning from the British Welsh Guard, Strassmeir moved to Washington, D.C. to pursue a career within the U.S. Department of Justice. According to Strassmeir himself, he had hoped to work for the operations section of the Drug Enforcement Administration. His efforts to obtain a career within the federal government were aided by Vincent Petruskie, a retired U.S. Air Force colonel who had apparently met Strassmeir's father while he (Petruskie) was stationed in Berlin. In interviews, Strassmeir has referred to Vincent Petruskie as "a former CIA guy my father had known". Petruskie confirms that he had assisted Andreas Strassmeir in finding such a job, but denies having any connection to the CIA. 
 
Strassmeir moved to Houston, Texas, in 1986 where he started working as a salesman for a computer company. During this time, he became involved with the Texas Light Infantry militia before eventually getting expelled due to speculation from members that Strassmeir was a government agent. Afterwards, he became active in right wing and neo-Nazi circles where he eventually met his future attorney, Kirk Lyons.

Andreas Strassmeir was also reported to have spent some time in Knoxville, Tennessee, where he obtained a state drivers license. According to Ray Woodruff, a landlord of Strassmeir's, he rented a 1,300-square-foot house located at 7613 Thorngrove Pike but never lived in it.

Elohim City
In 1991, Kirk Lyons introduced Andreas Strassmeir to Elohim City - a white separatist community in Oklahoma. A year later, Strassmeir moved there and became the chief of security and weapons training. According to Lyons, Strassmeir hoped to marry an Elohim City woman and gain permanent resident status in the United States.

During this time, he struck a friendship with Michael William Brescia, a member of the Aryan Republican Army. The two shared a room together on the compound.

While working as a confidential informant (CI) for the ATF, Elohim City resident, Carol Howe informed her agency handler about Andreas Strassmeir and how he would frequently talk about "blowing up federal buildings" and using "direct action against the U.S. Government". At the time, Carol Howe was unaware of Strassmeir's full name, and simply knew him as "Andy the German".

After the OKC Bombing, Strassmeir fled the compound with fellow Elohim City residents Pete and Tony Ward.

Departure from the United States
Robert Millar quickly "expelled" Andreas Strassmeier from Elohim City soon after he became aware that the FBI was looking at Strassmeir for possible ties to McVeigh and the bombing.

Notes from a 1997 FBI investigation state that sometime after the bombing, CIA pilot Dave Halloway flew Andreas Strassmer out of the United States. While that same report records that Strassmeir was flown to Berlin, many have speculated that he was instead flown to Mexico. However, in a letter to the McCurtain Gazette from Strassmeir's attorney Kirk Lyons, he says his client's sudden departure from the U.S. was aided by members of Germany's elite counterterrorism unit, GSG 9.

References

People from Houston
People from Knoxville, Tennessee
Living people
Oklahoma City bombing
1959 births
German emigrants to the United States
German Army personnel